At least two ships of the Royal Navy have been named HMS Olympia after Olympia, Greece:

 , launched in 1806, was a schooner. She was sold in 1815.
 , launched in 1917, was a trawler purchased from civilian service in 1939, and returned in 1945.

See also
 
 
 

Royal Navy ship names